Hidden Valley is an unincorporated community in Jefferson Township, Somerset County, Pennsylvania, United States.  The Hidden Valley Foundation is a large HOA (Home Owners Association) which comprises Hidden Valley, PA (15502) and the 1185 homes within its boundaries.  The community is governed by an elected Board of Directors and is managed by a professional staff within the South Ridge Center. Hidden Valley provides the community with 24/7/365 services including private roads, grounds maintenance, security, social & recreational programs, amenities (pools, tennis courts, pickleball courts, play grounds, parks, trails, the Mountain Metric Bike Race, and others), Architectural Control and enforcement of the CCR's (Conditions, Covenants, and Restrictions) to maintain the HOA.

Formally, Hidden Valley Foundation and the Hidden Valley Resort were the combined operation of a single entity, Hidden Valley Resorts, a management subsidiary of Kettler Brothers of Maryland. The developer's control was sunsetted per legal declaration, and as of January 1, 2020, and the community of Hidden Valley through the Hidden Valley Foundation became a self governing community.  The Hidden Valley Resort, a ski resort now owned by Vail Resorts, Inc., is located within the community, but is not part of the Hidden Valley Foundation (the HOA) along the southern side of Pennsylvania Route 31.  The Pennsylvania Turnpike (Interstates 70/76) is within a few miles of the community, which lies in the Laurel Highlands.

References

External links
http://www.wunderground.com/US/PA/Hidden_Valley.html

Unincorporated communities in Somerset County, Pennsylvania
Unincorporated communities in Pennsylvania